Graeme Robertson (born 25 September 1952) is a former Australian rules footballer who played with Carlton and Richmond in the Victorian Football League (VFL)
and Port Adelaide Football Club in the South Australian National Football League (SANFL).

Notes

External links 

Graeme Robertson's profile at Blueseum

1952 births
Carlton Football Club players
Richmond Football Club players
Kangaroo Flat Football Club players
Australian rules footballers from Victoria (Australia)
Living people
Port Adelaide Football Club (SANFL) players